John Paine (2 May 1883 – 1953) was a British weightlifter. He competed in the men's featherweight event at the 1920 Summer Olympics.

References

External links
 

1883 births
1953 deaths
British male weightlifters
Olympic weightlifters of Great Britain
Weightlifters at the 1920 Summer Olympics
Place of birth missing